Michael Gordon Duncan (born 8 August 1947) is a former New Zealand rugby union player. A centre and second five-eighth, Duncan represented Hawke's Bay at a provincial level, and was a member of the New Zealand national side, the All Blacks, in 1971. He played two matches for the All Blacks, both of them internationals against the touring British Lions.

References

1947 births
Living people
People educated at Lindisfarne College, New Zealand
New Zealand rugby union players
New Zealand international rugby union players
Hawke's Bay rugby union players
Rugby union centres
People from Waipawa
Rugby union players from the Hawke's Bay Region